"Battle of the Atom" is a 10-part comic book crossover storyline published by Marvel Comics that debuted in September and October 2013 and  ran through multiple X-Men books.

The story involves the X-Men of the future traveling to present time in order to force the time-displaced X-Men to return to their rightful time, as their presence in the current timeline will result in disastrous consequences.

Publication history 
Battle of the Atom was announced in April 2013. The story involves the X-Men of the future traveling to present time in order to force the All-New X-Men to return to their rightful time, as their presence in the current timeline will result in disastrous consequences.

Brian Michael Bendis, writer of All-New X-Men, stated that the use of time travel in the story is less important than the theme of characters exploring how the choices they make early in life affect them later on in life, in a manner similar to the 1986 feature film Peggy Sue Got Married. Musing on the nature of fate, and how these ideas inspired both his previous comics work, and "Battle of the Atom" in particular, Bendis explained:

Plot 
When Kitty Pryde's group of time displaced Original Five (O5) X-Men and Cyclops' Uncanny X-Men are forced to team up to stop an out of control new mutant, young Cyclops is killed by a Sentinel.  He is resurrected moments later by one of Cyclops' recruits, who is a healer. However, in the brief moments that Young Cyclops was dead, the adult Cyclops blinked out of existence and the world around the two groups suddenly began to shudder and shake, as if reality was collapsing from the time paradox.

This causes another round of debate from Wolverine's X-Men about returning the O5 to their proper place in the timeline. The debate is suddenly interrupted by the arrival of a group of older X-Men led by an aged Kitty Pryde, the grandson of Charles Xavier, and an adult Jean Grey (the time displaced O5 Jean Grey, having never returned to the past), dressed as the new Xorn.  They seek to force the X-Men to go back to the past.

Realizing that something does not seem right, O5 Jean escapes with O5 Cyclops.  The X-Men and "Future X-Men" pursue, with Xorn explaining that a catastrophe will soon befall the X-Men if the O5 do not return to their original place in the timeline.  The exact nature of that catastrophe is left ambiguous.

O5 Jean & Scott eventually make contact with Cyclops team of Uncanny X-Men, and after some consideration Scott agrees to help his younger self and young Jean.  Realizing that Scott's thinking on the matter is compromised, Emma Frost telepathically alerts the X-Men and Future X-Men of Young Jean's and Scotts location.  However, upon seeing Xorn attack her younger self, Emma has a change of heart and attacks Xorn with the Cuckoos and O5 Jean.

Xorn is able to defeat the combined powers of Emma and her Cuckoos, but O5 Jean is eventually able to defeat her.  Xorn gives O5 Jean a glimpse of the future, a ploy on her part, which convinces O5 Jean that they need to go back to their proper place in the timeline.  The three teams of X-Men part ways, with Cyclops unsure if this fight is really over.

Magik, who is also suspicious of the motives of these new X-Men, travels to the future along with O5 Beast and O5 Iceman.  It is discovered that these "Future X-Men" are really the "Future Brotherhood", and motives are purely self-serving.  This new Brotherhood was created when Alison Blaire, also known as the X-Man Dazzler, is elected president and quickly assassinated, with the identity of the assassin unrevealed.  The true "Future X-Men" agree to travel back in time and confront the Brotherhood.

Upon arriving at the X-mansion with O5 Jean, Scott and Angel, it is discovered that the O5 Beast and Iceman are in the future.  The Brotherhood realizes that they will soon have to fight Cyclops's team and the true "Future X-Men", and accelerate their plans.  It is revealed that the "Future Kitty Pryde" is really Raze, the shape shifting son of Mystique and Wolverine.  They attack the original X-Men, including an incapacitated Wolverine.  Raze is able to infiltrate Scott's team and capture O5 Iceman and Beast.

The O5 X-Men are brought to Beast's time machine and an attempt is made to send them back in time.  However, an unknown force prevents this process from being completed.  As the other Brotherhood members are overwhelmed by the Uncanny X-Men and the Future X-Men, the surviving Brotherhood members flee to Cape Citadel, the site of the first battle between the O5 X-Men and Magneto.

The Brotherhood attacks the military to attract the attention of S.H.I.E.L.D.  The fully united force of the Uncanny X-Men, Wolverine's team of X-Men, and the "Future" X-Men arrive to stop them.  Xorn is able to control the S.H.I.E.L.D. weapon systems on site and launch the government Sentinels, which were being created in secret.  The X-Men defeat the government Sentinels, and turn their attention to Xorn.  She is able to hold the combined forces off, but her powers overload and she explodes.

The exact catastrophe that befalls the X-Men due to the O5's presence is not revealed.  The Future X-Men return to their proper place in the timeline with their casualties.  The whereabouts of the Brotherhood member Raze is unknown.  The O5 X-Men, due to being nearly forced to go back in time, decide to leave the Jean Grey School and join the Uncanny X-Men. Kitty Pryde, disgusted that the modern X-Men tried to send the original five back by force, even hunting Cyclops and Jean down like criminals, quits and joins the O5 Team to continue to mentor them.

Cast
Time-displaced X-Men
Jean Grey (Past)
Cyclops (Past)
Beast (Past)
Iceman (Past)
Angel (Past)

Wolverine's X-Men
Wolverine
Storm
Beast
Iceman
Marvel Girl ll
Psylocke
Rogue
Shadowcat
Jubilee ll

Cyclops's X-Men
Cyclops
Emma Frost
Magneto
Magik
Tempus 
Three-In-One
Triage
Benjamin Deeds
Goldballs

Future Brotherhood
Xorn lll (older Jean Grey, from the time-displaced O5)
Charles Xavier II, son of Charles Xavier and Mystique
Beast
Raze Darkholme, son of Wolverine and Mystique
Molly Hayes
Ice Thing, sentient creation of Iceman
Deadpool

Future X-Men
Colossus, wielding Magik's Soulsword
Wolverine (Jubilee ll)
Phoenix (Kid Omega)
Ice Wizard (Iceman)
Wiccan, the new Sorcerer Supreme
Kymera, daughter of Storm
Sentinel X (Shogo, Jubilee's adopted son)

Titles involved
September 2013
Part 1: X-Men: Battle of the Atom #1
Part 2: All-New X-Men vol. 1 #16
Part 3: X-Men vol. 4 #5
Part 4: Uncanny X-Men vol. 3 #12
Part 5: Wolverine and the X-Men vol. 1 #36

October 2013
Part 6: All-New X-Men vol. 1 #17
Part 7: X-Men vol. 4 #6
Part 8: Uncanny X-Men vol. 3 #13
Part 9: Wolverine and the X-Men vol. 1 #37
Part 10: X-Men: Battle of the Atom #2

Critical reception

"Battle of the Atom" has been reviewed by a number of different websites, including IGN, iFanboy and Comic Book Resources.

Mobile game
In January 2014, a mobile card game based on the event was released for Android devices.

Collected editions

References

2013 comics debuts
Comics by Brian Michael Bendis